Scarification involves scratching, etching, burning/branding, or superficially cutting designs, pictures, or words into the skin as a permanent body modification or body art. The body modification can take roughly 6–12 months to heal. In the process of body scarification, scars are purposely formed by cutting or branding the skin by various methods (sometimes using further sequential aggravating wound-healing methods at timed intervals, like irritation). Scarification is sometimes called cicatrization (from the French equivalent).

History

Africa

Scarification, which is also known as cicatrization in European works, is sometimes included within the category of tattooing, due to both practices creating marks with pigment underneath and textures or pigments on the surface of the skin. In Africa, European colonial governments and European Christian missionaries criminalized and stigmatized the cultural practices of tattooing and scarification; consequently, the practices underwent decline, ended, or continued to be performed as acts of resistance.

North Africa

Between 5000 BCE and 4000 BCE, pastoral communities from the Sahara peopled the region of Neolithic Egypt and Neolithic Sudan. In this shared material culture of the Nile Valley region, figurines with markings have been found, which indicates that tattooing and scarification may have been cultural practices among these pastoral communities.

Algeria

During the early period of the Holocene (9500 BP - 7500 BP), Round Head rock art was created at Tassili N'Ajjer, in Algeria, and at Tadrart Acacus, in Libya, 70% of which is composed of anthropomorphic art forms; male and female art forms feature scarification marks that differ; linear design patterns are exclusive to male art forms, whereas, crescent-shaped and concentric circular design patterns are exclusive to female art forms. Between the 5th millennium BCE and the 4th millennium BCE, the Central Saharan rock art depiction of a horned running woman, who may have been a goddess or a dancer with body scarification markings (e.g., breasts, belly, thighs, shoulders, calves), was created by Africans, during the Round Head Period of Tassili N’Ajjer, in Tanzoumaitak, Algeria.

Egypt

During the early 2nd millennium BCE, amid the Eleventh Dynasty of Ancient Egypt, Amunet, a priestess of Hathor, underwent scarification and received a designed pattern of three horizontal parallel lines. In addition to the mummy of a priestess of Hathor, the mummy of a dancer from the Temple of Hathor, both of which have been dated to approximately 4000 BP, show evidence of scarification.

The stone relief of a man from Nubia, which features scarification marks on his forehead, has been dated to the 20th Dynasty of Ramesses III, during the New Kingdom (1181 BCE - 1150 BCE) period of Ancient Egypt.

Libya

During the early period of the Holocene (9500 BP - 7500 BP), Round Head rock art was created at Tassili N'Ajjer, in Algeria, and at Tadrart Acacus, in Libya, 70% of which is composed of anthropomorphic art forms; male and female art forms feature scarification marks that differ; linear design patterns are exclusive to male art forms, whereas, crescent-shaped and concentric circular design patterns are exclusive to female art forms.

Sudan

Kadada figurines from Upper Nubia, which have been dated to 3600 BCE, feature markings that may be tattooing or scarification.

Since at least the ancient Meroe period of Nubia, the cultural practice of facial marking has continued in Sudan, though it has become less common in recent times.

West Africa

Benin

Beninese people practiced scarification as a form of identity marker and citizenship in Benin. Since 1930 CE, the rate of scarification has decreased. However, scarification markings (iwu) have since undergone a revival in expression through clothing.

Ghana

Tribal markings originated in more ancient times. Prior to the enslaving raids of the 17th century CE, sculptures with scarification markings were created as early as the 14th century CE. Tribal markings became more widespread as a response to enslaving raids in the 17th century CE. Tribal markings, as symbols of group identity, tied together individuals of a common cultural heritage and ancestry. Consequently, this enabled individuals to find enslaved people who originated from the same African ethnic group. The occurrence of a greater number of medical markings in southern Ghana and a greater number of tribal markings in northern Ghana may be due to enslaving raids occurring more in the northern region of Ghana. As a result of this history, there may be greater individual awareness of collective identity in the northern region of Ghana than in the southern region of Ghana.

Mali

A wooden standing female figurine from the Inland Niger Delta region of Djenné-Djenno in Mali, which feature dotted scarification markings in the temple region of the head and indication of pregnancy, may have been created by Djennenke peoples between the 11th century CE and the 13th century CE.

At Djenné-Djenno, the sculpture of a mother, with four children, features scarification design patterns (e.g., lines on temples, circles on arms, circles on chest). The sculpture has been dated between the 12th century CE and the 15th century CE. In the westernmost region of Djenné-Djenno, there was also the head of a terracotta statuette, which may have been constructed in the latter period of Djenné-Djenno or a period thereafter, and featured three snakes encircling the neck region and oblique-shaped scarification markings on its cheeks; snakes are a recurring trait among statuettes found in the Inner Niger Delta region.

Maternity figurines and mounted warrior figurines from the Inland Niger Delta region of Djenné-Djenno in Mali, which feature dotted scarification markings in the temple regions of their heads, may have been the Kagoro clan of the Soninke people or the Djennenke peoples between the 13th century CE and the 16th century CE.

Jennenke-styled brass alloy figurines with serpent ornaments and scarification markings, which have been dated between the 15th century CE and the 17th century CE, may have been inspired from earlier figurines from Old Jenne and Dogon-Tellem cultural traditions, as well as may have their origin in Dogon Country, Mali. Based on the composition of the brass alloy, the brass alloy may have derived from the Hartz Mountains.

Nigeria

Nok sculpture remnants from Katsina Ala feature various stylistic details, including facial markings. One of the Nok sculptures from Katsina Ala has been dated, via thermoluminescence dating, to 400 ± 125 BCE 

Between 660 CE and 1045 CE, the Igbo Ukwu culture of the Kingdom of Nri produced various types of bronze items (e.g., beetles, flies, grasshopper/locust eggs, and heads of animals such as elephants, leopards, monkeys, pythons, rams, and snails) from Igbo Ukwu and Ezira.

Early archaeological evidence of body modification, such as tattoo and scarification markings, have been found among the Benin, Ife, Igbo, Nok, and Ukwa peoples, including male and female Benin bronzes, which have been dated to the 16th century CE and the 17th century CE.

In Nigeria, evidence of scarification has been found on Ife sculptures composed of terracotta and copper, which have been dated to 1100 CE, and Owo sculptures composed of terracotta, which have been dated to 1400 CE. There are also Yoruba facial markings that have been documented during the 19th century CE and the 20th century CE.

Central Africa

Bantu-speaking Central Africans and other Bantu-speaking Africans, such as the Baluba, Bafipa, Batshokwe, Baushi, Mashona, constructed decorated furnaces, which symbolized transformation as well as were made in the shape of women, with breasts, and scarification usually made in the region of the stomach, during the Early Iron Age in Africa.

Eastern Africa

Ethiopia

At Dirikoro, in the southwestern-most region of Ethiopia, engraved and painted pastoral rock art have been linked to cattle scarification practices, via branding, and body scarification practices (e.g., Riru, Kichoa) among the Mursi people. Mursi men receive Riru scarification markings, in the form of a Miren design pattern (a double ‘u’ symbol), which may be received when cattle raids are successful; while Mursi women receive three Miren-styled markings, Mursi men receive four; in addition to being connected by heat used in the process of scarification, both oxen and Mursi men receive four Miren-styled markings. While Saharan pastoral rock art has been dated to the second half of the seventh millennium BP, Ethiopian pastoral rock art has been dated between 5000 BP and 4000 BP.

Square symbols in western Ethiopian rock art and facial scarification design patterns, mostly found on women from Ethio-Sudanese borderland groups, such as the Gumuz people and the Kwama people in the Benishangul-Gumuz region of Ethiopia and the Mabaan people of Sudan, share a close similarity in appearance. A single cow out of a herd, managed by cattle pastoralists, also had a reticular-shaped scarification marking that matched Bel Bembesh rock art in Assosa. Among western Ethiopian rock art sites in the Benishangul-Gumuz region, the rock painting sites of Bel Bembesh and Bel ash-Sharifu may be dated to the Later Stone Age; the painted Bel K’urk’umu rock art, near Assosa, has been radiocarbon dated between 4965 BP and 875 BP, which corresponds with pottery sherds found near the rock art that have been dated between 1985 BP and 275 BP; these rock painting sites have been attributed in origin to local Koman speakers, who may have resided in the area for millennia, prior to the influx of Sudanese herders during the mid-Holocene.

Southern Africa

South Africa

At Schroda, located in the region of Zhizo, Limpopo, South Africa that was peopled by Bantu-speaking peoples, 2000 figurine remnants with scarification markings were found, which date between the 7th century CE and the 8th century CE; from this foundation, Great Zimbabwe emerged in the 13th century CE.

Traditional practitioners 
Scarification has been traditionally practiced by darker skinned cultures, possibly because it is usually more visible on darker skinned people than tattoos. It was common in indigenous cultures of Africa (especially in the west), Melanesia, and Australia. Some indigenous cultures in North America also practiced scarification, including the ancient Maya.

Among the ethnic groups in sub-Saharan Africa that traditionally practice scarification are the Gonja, Dagomba, Frafra, Mamprusi, Nanumba, Bali, Tɔfin, Bobo, Montol, Kofyar, Yoruba, and Tiv people of West Africa, and the Dinka, Nuer, Surma, Shilluk, Toposa, Moru, Bondei, Shambaa, Barabaig, and Maasai people of East Africa.

Reasons
Within anthropology, the study of the body as a boundary has been long debated. In 1909, Van Gennep described bodily transformations, including tattooing, scarification, and painting, as rites of passage. In 1963, Levi-Strauss described the body as a surface waiting for the imprintation of culture. Turner (1980) first used the term "social skin" in his detailed discussion of how Kayapo culture was constructed and expressed through individual bodies. Inscribed skin highlights an issue that has been central to anthropology since its inception: the question of boundaries between the individual and society, between societies, and between representation and experiences.

Rites of passage and belonging 
Traditionally, the most common reason for scarification has been as a rite of passage.

Scarification has been widely used by many West African tribes to mark milestone stages in both men and women's lives, such as puberty and marriage. In many tribes, members unwilling to participate in scarification were generally not included in the group's activities, and are often shunned from their society. According to anthropologist Grace Harris, group members lacking the normal characteristics consistent with the group are not considered as having acquired the full standing as agents in their society; they would also lack the capacity for meaningful behavior, such as greeting, commanding, and stating. Therefore, scarification can transform partial tribe members into "normal" members entirely accepted by the group. Scarification is a form of language not readily expressed, except through extensive and intricate greetings, and gives the ability to communicate fully, which is a key element for being considered as a normal member of the group.One reason why scarification is used as confirmation of adulthood is how it shows the ability to endure pain. With young men, the endurance of the pain of scarring exhibits strength and discipline, especially in tribes where males have roles as hunters and warriors. A young man who has already experienced the feeling of torn or cut flesh is considered less likely to fear the teeth of a wild animal or the tip of an enemy’s spear. In Ethiopia and Zambia, elaborate scarification is often done on women at puberty, used to denote a willingness to be a mother. The markings show that she can stand the pain of childbirth, as well as being an indication of her emotional maturity.

Some of these rites of passage have spiritual or religious roots, such young boys in the Chambri tribe of Papua New Guinea undergo scarification resembling crocodile scales to mark their transition into manhood, a ritual which stems from the belief that humans evolved from crocodiles.

In Ethiopia, Suri men scar their bodies to show that they have killed someone from an enemy tribe; the Mursi practice scarification for largely aesthetic reasons in order to attract the opposite sex and enhance the tactile experience of sex. The Ekoi of Nigeria believe that the scars serve, on their way to the afterlife, as money.

Identity 
 Scarification can be used to transmit complex messages about identity; such permanent body markings may emphasize fixed social, political, and religious roles. Tattoos, scars, brands, and piercings, when voluntarily acquired, are ways of showing a person's autobiography on the surface of the body to the world.

Scarification can also help change status from victim to survivor. These individuals pass through various kinds of ritual death and rebirth, and redefine the relationship between self and society through the skin.

Many people in certain regions of Africa who have "markings" can be identified as belonging to a specific tribe or ethnic group. Some of the tribes in Northern Ghana who use the markings are the Gonjas, Nanumbas, Dagombas, Frafras and Mamprusis.

Medicinal 
For the Nuba tribe of Sudan, scars can serve a medicinal purpose; scars above the eyes are believed to improve eyesight, and scars on the temples are believed to help relieve headaches. In some cultures, scarification is used in traditional medicine to treat some illness by inserting medicine (usually herbs or powdered root) under the skin to heal a variety of infections and illnesses such as Malaria.

Methods
Scarification is not a precise practice; variables, such as skin type, cut depth, and how the wound is treated while healing, make the outcome unpredictable. A method that works on one person may not work on another. The scars tend to spread as they heal, so outcome design is usually simple, the details being lost during healing.Some common scarification techniques include:

Ink rubbing Tattoo ink (or similar agent) is rubbed into a fresh cut to add color or extra visiblity to the scar. Most of the ink remains in the skin as the cut heals. This was how tattoos were initially done before the use of needles to inject ink.
Skin removal/skinning Skin removal allows for larger markings than simple cutting. The skin is raised with a hook and removed with a razor blade. This process can take many hours, and often requires repeated removal of scabs for best visiblity of the scars.
Packing An inert material such as clay or ash is packed into the wound; massive hypertrophic scars are formed during healing as the wound pushes out the substance that had been inserted into the wound. Inflammatory substances can be used to improve keloid formation.

Dangers
Scarification produces harm and trauma to the skin. Infection is common when tools are not sterilised properly. Scarification has been linked to the spread of HIV/AIDS and Hepatitis C when tools are shared between people. In the West, body modification artists may have less experience with scarification due to lower demand, meaning they have less knowledge on how to perform it safely.

See also
Body modification
Dueling scars
Tattoo

References

External links

 Pictures of scarification in Africa – Features by Jean-Michel Clajot, Belgian photographer and Saï Sotima Tchantipo Doctor Anthropology
 Extensive Scarification Article – Features different scarification techniques and advice
 BME Website – Chronicles the current and historical body modifications world internationally
 Scarification – entry in BME Encyclopedia

 
Body art
Body modification
Tattooing